The 3rd Grand Prix, 12 Hours of Sebring, was the inaugural round of the 1953 World Sportscar Championship and was held at the Sebring International Raceway, on 8 March 1953.

Report

Entry

A total of 81 cars were entered for the event, across eight classes based on engine sizes, ranging from up to 750cc to over 8.0 litre. Of these 59 cars practised, 54 qualified to race.

Amongst the mostly American entrants, the greatest news for the 1953 race was that the famous English Aston Martin team would join the French factory DB’s for the 12 Hour competition. In fact, David Brown and René Bonnet, heads of these European manufacturers, both went to Florida to watch the race. Bonnet also took part in the race.

Race

The race started at noon, and ran until midnight, on a day described as "partly cloudy and mild", in front of an estimated crowd of 12,500 spectators.

The Aston Martins made a great start, leading the first 32 laps of the Florida road course before losing the lead as a result of an accident. The #57 Cunningham C-4R then took over lead and was never headed for the rest of the race.

The car was driven by Phil Walters and John Fitch took the winner spoils for Briggs Cunningham’s team. They were boosted to the lead when the front running Aston Martin of Geoff Duke and Peter Collins collided with a Jaguar, and was forced to retire with accident damage. Walters and Fitch drove their Florida license plated Cunningham C-4R to victory, covering a distance of 908.9 miles, averaging a speed of 75.338mph. One lap adrift in second place was the Aston Martin DB3 of the Reg Parnell and George Abecassis, despite reportedly being hampered by having one of its headlamps not working due to an earlier collision with a bollard filed with concrete marking the circuit on what was at the time largely an airfield.

There was one car fire, the Allard-Cadillac J2X of Paul Ramos was destroyed when a fuel line split, however the driver, Anthony Cumming escaped unharmed. Another competitor, Randy Pearsall, also escaped injury when he flipped his Jaguar XK120.

Classification

Sebring 12 hours

Class Winners are in Bold text.

 Fastest lap: John Fitch, 120.540 mph

Class Winners

Standings after the race

References

12 Hours of Sebring
Sebring
Sebring
Sebring
Sebring